VP stands for vice president, an officer in government or business below a president in rank.

VP may also refer to:

Arts and entertainment
 VP Records,  a Queens, New York reggae record label
 VenetianPrincess (born 1984), pseudonym of internet personality Jodie-Amy Rivera

Science and technology
 Variegate porphyria, an inherited medical disorder
 Vasopressin, a hormone found in most mammals, including humans
 Videophone, a telephone with a video screen
 Virtual Processor, a virtual machine created by Tao Group 
 Voges–Proskauer test, in microbiology, a test to detect the molecule acetoin in a bacterial culture
 Virtus.pro, a professional e-sports organisation, based in Moscow, Russia (Dota 2) and Warsaw, Poland (CS:GO)
 3,3,5-Trimethylcyclohexyl 3-pyridyl methylphosphonate, a nerve agent
 Phase velocity, the velocity at which the phase of a wave propagates, given a certain frequency

Businesses and organizations
 VASP (IATA code VP, 1933-2005), Brazilian airline
 Flyme (IATA code VP since 2011), Maldivian airline

Other uses
 Vojvodina's Party (Vojvođanska partija), a political party in Serbia
 Patriotic Party (Turkey), a political party in Turkey
 Holden VP Commodore, an automobile produced by Australian automaker Holden
 Verb phrase, in linguistics, a structure composed of the predicative elements of a sentence
 vita patris, Latin for "during the life of the father" (e.g. in the expression "died v.p.")
 Victoria Park, Melbourne, an Australian rules football ground
 Vigyan Pragati, a magazine
 a patrol squadron of U.S. Navy aircraft
 /vp/, the Pokémon board on 4chan